Linley Hamilton (born 17 March 1965) is a musician, educator and broadcaster from Northern Ireland. He is a Dr. of Jazz Performance and Lecturer of Music at Ulster University Magee. He presents Jazz World with Linley Hamilton on BBC Radio Ulster and leads his own jazz quintet playing trumpet and flugelhorn. Hamilton's associations as a session musician include Van Morrison, Jacqui Dankworth, Andrew Strong and Paul Brady. He has 5 studio albums and is curator of the internationally acclaimed Jazz venue, Magy’s Farm in Co. Down, Northern Ireland. His current band is made up of Adam Nussbaum drums, Mark Egan bass, Cian Boylan piano and Derek DOC O’Connor. His wife Maggie is an author specialising in nature writing and they host a mini-Donkey Sanctuary at their farm.

Discography
Up To Now (2003)
Taylor Made (2011)
In Transition (2014)
Making other Arrangements (2018)
For the Record (2020)Featured onOh What a World (Paul Brady) (2000)Songbook (Paul Brady) (2002)Detour Ahead (Jacqui Dankworth) (2003)Hawana Way (Paul Brady) (2003)Two of Us (Dana Masters)Shadows Linger  (John Donegan Sextet)In Another Lifetime'' (Swift)

References

External links
 
 
 Jazz World with Linley Hamilton (BBC Radio Ulster)

1965 births
Living people
Jazz musicians from Northern Ireland